Lichauco is a surname. Notable people with the surname include:

Jessie Lichauco (1912–2021), American centenarian, wife of Marcial
Marcial Lichauco (1902–1971), Filipino lawyer and diplomat

Hokkien-language surnames